The Stringfellow Acid Pits are a toxic waste dump, and a Superfund site, located in Jurupa Valley, California, United States, just north of the neighborhood of Glen Avon. The site became the center of national news coverage in the early 1980s, in part because it was considered one of the most polluted sites in California, and because it became linked with mismanagement and scandal in the U.S. Environmental Protection Agency.

History
Situated at the base of the Jurupa Mountains in Pyrite Canyon, the  site was originally a rock quarry owned by James Stringfellow. The resulting valley seemed a perfect disposal site for toxic waste. In 1956, after a year long negotiations, and at the request of the Santa Ana Regional Water Quality Control Board (RWQCB), Stringfellow opened the site for dumping toxic waste.  Included in the negotiations was Stringfellow receiving assurances from a geologist who deemed the site safe for dumping. The geologic survey claimed that the solid bedrock made the valley an ideal and safe site for waste.

In 1972, after it became apparent that the pits were leaking into local groundwater, RWQCB shut down the site. During the facility's 16 years of operation, more than 34 million gallons of liquid industrial waste was deposited in evaporation ponds. Stringfellow claimed his company was without assets, and title to the land passed to the State of California, with oversight given to the Santa Ana River Water Quality Board. Between 1969 and 1980, poor weather and management resulted in several spills and intentional releases of toxic chemicals into Pyrite Creek, which flowed into storm channels running through Glen Avon.

In the early 1980s, after the passage of the Comprehensive Environmental Response, Compensation and Liability Act, or Superfund, the site came to the attention of the US Environmental Protection Agency. It was listed as the most contaminated site in California, and was one of the first sites selected for remediation under the Act.  The severity of the problems and a subsequent scandal related to the site made the acid pits the subject of national television coverage.

Rita Lavelle, appointed director of the Superfund in 1982 by President Ronald Reagan, was convicted on federal charges of perjury related to an investigation into misuse of the United States Environmental Protection Agency's (EPA) Superfund money during her tenure with the Agency, and irregularities at the Stringfellow Acid Pits. The Lavelle incident was labeled "Sewergate." Anne Gorsuch Burford, mother of U.S. Supreme Court Justice Neil Gorsuch, resigned as EPA Administrator amid the controversy. 

Currently, the Stringfellow Site is managed by the California Department of Toxic Substances Control (DTSC). According to DTSC, the cleanup effort will take approximately 500 years. 

The litigation involved with the Stringfellow site resulted in numerous lawsuits, including the United States v. Stringfellow case in federal court, the Newman v. Stringfellow personal injury case in Riverside Superior Court, and the Hendler v. United States case before the U.S. Court of Federal Claims and the U.S. Court for the Federal Circuit. The U.S. Supreme Court also decided one issue in Stringfellow v. Concerned Neighbors in Action, 480 U.S. 370 (1987). The subsequent insurance litigation lasted well into the 21st century. In total, the litigation spanned more than three decades.

See also
List of Superfund sites in California
Penny Newman

References

Further reading
Craig, Brian, Stringfellow Acid Pits: The Toxic and Legal Legacy, University of Michigan Press, 2020.
Gunther, Jane Davies. Riverside County, California, Place Names; Their Origins and Their Stories, Riverside, CA, Rubidoux Printing, 1984.

External links
US Environmental Protection Agency; Region 9 Superfund;  Stringfellow - Site Overview, retrieved 2010-08-29.
US Environmental Protection Agency; Superfund Sites; Stringfellow, retrieved 2010-08-29.
Find Law; US Supreme Court; STRINGFELLOW v. CONCERNED NEIGHBORS IN ACTION, 480 U.S. 370 (1987)
Online Archive of California; Guide to the Stringfellow Hazardous Waste Site collection.

Jurupa Valley, California
Superfund sites in California
Quarries in the United States
Environmental issues in California
Geography of Riverside County, California